A magneto-optical trap (MOT) is an apparatus which uses laser cooling and a spatially-varying magnetic field to create a trap which can produce samples of cold, trapped, neutral atoms. Temperatures achieved in a MOT can be as low as several microkelvin, depending on the atomic species, which is two or three times below the photon recoil limit.

A MOT is formed from the intersection of a weak quadrupolar spatially-varying magnetic field and six circularly-polarized red-detuned optical molasses beams. As atoms travel away from the field zero at the center of the trap (halfway between the coils), the spatially-varying Zeeman shift brings an atomic transition into resonance which gives rise to a scattering force that pushes the atoms back towards the center of the trap. This is why a MOT traps atoms, and because this force arises from photon scattering in which atoms receive momentum "kicks" in the direction opposite their motion, it also slows the atoms (i.e. cools them), on average, over repeated absorption and spontaneous emission cycles. In this way, a MOT is able to trap and cool atoms with initial velocities of hundreds of meters per second down to tens of centimeters per second (again, depending upon the atomic species).

Although charged particles can be trapped using a Penning trap or a Paul trap using a combination of electric and magnetic fields, those traps are ineffective for neutral atoms.

Theoretical description of a MOT 
Two coils in an anti-Helmholtz configuration are used to generate a weak quadrupolar magnetic field; here, we will consider the coils as being separated along the -axis. In the proximity of the field zero, located halfway between the two coils along the -direction, the field gradient is uniform and the field itself varies linearly with position. This results in spatially-dependent energy shifts of the excited-state sublevels, as the Zeeman shift is proportional to the field strength and in this configuration the field strength is linear in position.

In combination with the magnetic field, pairs of counter-propagating circularly-polarized laser beams are sent in along three orthogonal axes, for a total of six MOT beams (there are exceptions to this, but a minimum of five beams is required to make a 3D MOT). The beams must be circularly polarized to ensure that photon absorption can only occur for certain transitions between the ground state   and the sublevels of the excited state , where . In other words, the circularly-polarized beams enforce selection rules on the allowed electric dipole transitions between states.    

At the center of the trap, the magnetic field is zero and atoms are "dark" to incident red-detuned photons. That is, at the center of the trap, the Zeeman shift is zero for all states and so the transition frequency  from  remains unchanged. The detuning of the photons from this frequency means that there will not be an appreciable amount of absorption (and therefore emission) by atoms in the center of the trap, hence the term "dark". Thus, the coldest, slowest moving atoms accumulate in the center of the MOT where they scatter very few photons.   

Now consider an atom which is moving in the -direction. The Zeeman effect shifts the energy of the  state lower in energy, decreasing the energy gap between it and the  state; that is, the frequency associated with the transition decreases. Red-detuned photons, which only drive  transitions, propagating in the -direction thus become closer to resonance as the atom travels further from the center of the trap, increasing the scattering rate and scattering force. When an atom absorbs a photon, it is excited to the  state and gets a "kick" of one photon recoil momentum, in the direction opposite to its motion, where . The atom, now in an excited state, will then spontaneously emit a photon in a random direction and after many absorption-spontaneous emission events, the atom will have, on average, been "pushed" back towards the field-zero of the trap.

Mathematically, the radiation pressure force that atoms experience in a MOT is given by:    

    

Doppler cooling

Thus, when an atom absorbs a photon, it is given a momentum kick in the direction of the photon before absorption. By detuning a laser beam to a frequency less than the resonant frequency (also known as red detuning), laser light is only absorbed if the light is frequency up-shifted by the Doppler effect, which occurs whenever the atom is moving towards the laser source. This applies a friction force to the atom whenever it moves towards a laser source.

For cooling to occur along all directions, the atom must see this friction force along all three Cartesian axes; this is most easily achieved by illuminating the atom with three orthogonal laser beams, which are then reflected back along the same direction.

Magnetic trapping 
Magnetic trapping is created by adding a spatially varying magnetic quadrupole field to the red detuned optical field needed for laser cooling. This causes a Zeeman shift in the magnetic-sensitive mf levels, which increases with the radial distance from the center of the trap. Because of this, as an atom moves away from the center of the trap, the atomic resonance is shifted closer to the frequency of the laser light, and the atom becomes more likely to get a photon kick towards the center of the trap.

The direction of the kick is given by the polarization of the light, which is either left or right handed circular, giving different interactions with the different mf levels. The correct polarizations are used so that photons moving towards the center of the trap will be on resonance with the correct shifted atomic energy level, always driving the atom towards the center.

Atomic structure necessary for magneto-optical trapping

As a thermal atom at room temperature has many thousands of times the momentum of a single photon, the cooling of an atom must involve many absorption-spontaneous emission cycles, with the atom losing up to ħk of momenta each cycle .
Because of this, if an atom is to be laser cooled, it must possess a specific energy level structure known as a closed optical loop, where following an excitation-spontaneous emission event, the atom is always returned to its original state.
85Rubidium, for example, has a closed optical loop between the  state and the  state. Once in the excited state, the atom is forbidden from decaying to any of the  states, which would not conserve parity, and is also forbidden from decaying to the  state, which would require an angular momentum change of −2, which cannot be supplied by a single photon.

Many atoms that do not contain closed optical loops can still be laser cooled, however, by using repump lasers which re-excite the population back into the optical loop after it has decayed to a state outside of the cooling cycle. The magneto-optical trapping of rubidium 85, for example, involves cycling on the closed  transition. On excitation, however, the detuning necessary for cooling gives a small, but non-zero overlap with the  state. If it falls back to the dark state, the atom stops cycling between ground and excited state, and the cooling and trapping of this atom stops. A repump laser which is resonant with the  transition is used to recycle the population back into the optical loop so that cooling can continue.

Apparatus

Laser

All magneto-optical traps require at least one trapping laser plus any necessary repumper lasers (see above). These lasers need stability, rather than high power, requiring no more than the saturation intensity, but a linewidth much less than the Doppler width, usually several megahertz. Because of their low cost, compact size and ease of use, laser diodes are used for many of the standard MOT species while the linewidth and stability of these lasers is controlled using servo systems, which stabilises the lasers to an atomic frequency reference by using, for example, saturated absorption spectroscopy and the Pound-Drever-Hall technique to generate a locking signal.

By employing a 2-dimensional diffraction grating it is possible to generate the configuration of laser beams required for a magneto-optical trap from a single laser beam and thus have a very compact magneto-optical trap.

Vacuum chamber
The MOT cloud is loaded from a background of thermal vapour, or from an atomic beam, usually slowed down to the capture velocity using a Zeeman slower. However, the trapping potential in a magneto-optical trap is small in comparison to thermal energies of atoms and most collisions between trapped atoms and the background gas supply enough energy to the trapped atom to kick it out of the trap. If the background pressure is too high, atoms are kicked out of the trap faster than they can be loaded, and the trap does not form. This means that the MOT cloud only forms in a vacuum chamber with a background pressure of less than 10 micropascals (10−10 bar).

The limits to the magneto-optical trap

The minimum temperature and maximum density of a cloud in a magneto-optical trap is limited by the spontaneously emitted photon in cooling each cycle. While the asymmetry in atom excitation gives cooling and trapping forces, the emission of the spontaneously emitted photon is in a random direction, and therefore contributes to a heating of the atom. Of the two ħk kicks the atom receives in each cooling cycle, the first cools, and the second heats: a simple description of laser cooling which enables us to calculate a point at which these two effects reach equilibrium, and therefore define a lower temperature limit, known as the Doppler cooling limit.

The density is also limited by the spontaneously emitted photon. As the density of the cloud increases, the chance that the spontaneously emitted photon will leave the cloud without interacting with any further atoms tends to zero. The absorption, by a neighboring atom, of a spontaneously emitted photon gives a 2ħk momentum kick between the emitting and absorbing atom which can be seen as a repulsive force, similar to coulomb repulsion, which limits the maximum density of the cloud.

As of 2022 the method has been demonstrated to work up to triatomic molecules.

Application 
As a result of low densities and speeds of atoms achieved by optical cooling, the mean free path in a ball of MOT cooled atoms is very long, and atoms may be treated as ballistic. This is useful for quantum information experiments where it is necessary to have long coherence times (the time an atom spends in a defined quantum state). Because of the continuous cycle of absorption and spontaneous emission, which causes decoherence, any quantum manipulation experiments must be performed with the MOT beams turned off. In this case, it is common to stop the expansion of the gases during quantum information experiments by loading the cooled atoms into a dipole trap.

A magneto-optical trap is usually the first step to achieving Bose–Einstein condensation. Atoms are cooled in a MOT down to a few times the recoil limit, and then evaporatively cooled which lowers the temperature and increases the density to the required phase space density.

A MOT of 133Cs was used to make some of the best measurements of CP violation.

See also
 Dipole trap
 Zeeman slower

References

 
 
 
 
 
 Liwag, John Waruel F. Cooling and trapping of 87Rb atoms in a magneto-optical trap using low-power diode lasers, Thesis 621.39767 L767c (1999)
 

Atomic, molecular, and optical physics
Particle traps